The 2014–15 NCAA football bowl games were a series of college football bowl games. They completed the 2014 NCAA Division I FBS football season, and included 39 team-competitive games and four all-star games. The games began on December 20, 2014 and, aside from the all-star games, ended with the 2015 College Football Playoff National Championship which was played on January 12, 2015.

A new record total of 39 team-competitive bowl games were played, including the national championship game and the inaugural Camellia Bowl, Boca Raton Bowl and Bahamas Bowl. While bowl games had been the purview of only the very best teams for nearly a century, this was the ninth consecutive year that teams with non-winning seasons participated in bowl games. To fill the 76 available team-competitive bowl slots, a total of 13 teams (17% of all participants) with non-winning seasons participated in bowl games—12 with a .500 (6-6) season and, for the third time in four years, a team with a sub-.500 (6-7) season.

Schedule
The schedule for the 2014–15 bowl games is below. All times are EST (UTC−5).  The rankings used are the CFP rankings.

Playoff
The 2014–15 postseason was the first to feature a College Football Playoff (CFP) to determine a national champion of Division I FBS college football. Four teams were selected by a 13-member committee to participate in a single-elimination tournament, whose semifinals were held at the Rose Bowl and the Sugar Bowl as part of a yearly rotation of six bowls. Their winners advanced to the 2015 College Football Playoff National Championship at AT&T Stadium in Arlington, Texas.

CFP bowl games and Championship Game
Starting with the 2014–15 postseason, six College Football Playoff (CFP) bowl games will host two semifinal playoff games on a rotating basis—the Rose Bowl, Sugar Bowl, Orange Bowl, Cotton Bowl, Peach Bowl, and Fiesta Bowl.  The games will be played on two days, on or around January 1.  The winners of the two semifinal games will advance to the College Football Playoff National Championship.  These six bowl games are also known as the New Year's Six. All games will be televised by ESPN and broadcast on the radio by ESPN Radio.

Non-CFP bowl games
For the 2014–15 postseason, four new bowl games were added — the Camellia Bowl, Miami Beach Bowl, Boca Raton Bowl, and Bahamas Bowl — bringing the total number of bowl games to 39. Additionally, the Little Caesars Pizza Bowl was replaced by the Quick Lane Bowl.

Post College Football Playoff all-star games

Selection of the teams

CFP top 25 teams
On December 7, 2014, the 13-member College Football Playoff selection committee announced their final team rankings for the year.

Conference champions' bowl games
Three bowls featured two conference champions playing against each other—the Boca Raton Bowl, Rose Bowl, and Sugar Bowl. Rankings are per the above CFP standings.

 denotes a conference that named co-champions
 Georgia Southern was not bowl-eligible, due to their transition from FCS to FBS

Bowl-eligible teams
 American (6): Cincinnati, East Carolina, Houston, Memphis, Temple, UCF
 ACC (11): Boston College, Clemson, Duke, Florida State, Georgia Tech, Louisville, Miami (FL), NC State, North Carolina, Pittsburgh, Virginia Tech
 Big 12 (7): Baylor, Kansas State, Oklahoma, Oklahoma State, TCU, Texas, West Virginia
 Big Ten (10): Illinois, Iowa, Maryland, Michigan State, Minnesota, Nebraska, Ohio State, Penn State, Rutgers, Wisconsin
 Conference USA (7): Louisiana Tech, Marshall, Middle Tennessee State, Rice, UAB, UTEP, Western Kentucky
 Independents (3): BYU, Navy, Notre Dame
 MAC (6):  Bowling Green, Central Michigan, Northern Illinois, Ohio, Toledo, Western Michigan
 Mountain West (7): Air Force, Boise State, Colorado State, Fresno State, Nevada, San Diego State, Utah State
 Pac-12 (8): Arizona, Arizona State, Oregon, Stanford, UCLA, USC, Utah, Washington
 SEC (12):  Alabama, Arkansas, Auburn, Florida, Georgia, LSU, Mississippi State, Missouri, Ole Miss, South Carolina, Tennessee, Texas A&M
 Sun Belt (4): Arkansas State, Louisiana–Lafayette, South Alabama, Texas State

Number of bowl berths available: 76 
Number of bowl-eligible teams: 81

Bowl-eligible teams that did not receive a berth
As there were more bowl-eligible teams than bowl berths, five bowl-eligible teams did not receive a bowl berth:
 Middle Tennessee (6–6)
 Ohio (6–6)
 Temple (6–6)
 Texas State (7–5)
 UAB (6–6)

Bowl-ineligible teams
 American (5): Connecticut, SMU, Tulane, Tulsa, USF
 ACC (3):  Syracuse, Virginia, Wake Forest
 Big Ten (4): Indiana, Michigan, Northwestern, Purdue
 Big 12 (3): Iowa State, Kansas, Texas Tech
 Conference USA (6):  FIU, Florida Atlantic, North Texas, Old Dominion†, Southern Miss, UTSA
 Independents (1): Army
 MAC (7): Akron, Ball State, Buffalo, Eastern Michigan, Kent State, Massachusetts, Miami (OH)
 Mountain West (5): Hawai'i, New Mexico, San Jose State, UNLV, Wyoming
 Pac 12 (4): California, Colorado, Oregon State, Washington State
 SEC (2): Kentucky, Vanderbilt
 Sun Belt (7): Appalachian State†, Georgia Southern†, Georgia State, Idaho‡, Louisiana–Monroe, New Mexico State, Troy

Number of bowl-ineligible teams: 47

† – Appalachian State (7–5), Georgia Southern (9–3, Sun Belt champions), and Old Dominion (6–6) were conditionally eligible based on win–loss record. However, under FCS-to-FBS transition rules, they were not eligible because enough teams qualified under normal circumstances.

‡ – Idaho was ineligible for postseason play due to an insufficient Academic Progress Rate. However, the Vandals would not have been eligible without the ban, as they finished with a 1–10 record.

References

Further reading